Mackay is a city in the Mackay Region on the eastern or Coral Sea coast of Queensland, Australia.
Mackay is described as being in either Central Queensland or North Queensland, as these regions are not precisely defined.
More generally, the area is known as the Mackay–Whitsunday Region. Nicknames of Mackay include the Sugar capital and Macktown.

Founded in 1862 by British colonists as Alexandra, in honour of Princess Alexandra of Denmark, the city was later renamed after John Mackay. Sugarcane plantations became the economic foundations of the city, with the first being the Alexandra plantation established in 1867. These plantations used South Sea Islanders that had been blackbirded as indentured labourers or slaves.  The trades ending in 1904 roughly coincided with the immigration of Mediterranean migrants from Italy and Malta beginning in 1891 to work the sugarcane plantations, and by the 1930s one third of Australia’s Italian migrants lived in North Queensland. The city was nearly destroyed in the 1918 cyclone, and the following reconstruction used primarily Art Deco and Spanish Mission architectural styles for which the city is famous.

Name
The city was named after the slave trader John Mackay. In 1860, he was the leader of an expedition into the Pioneer Valley. Initially Mackay proposed to name the river Mackay River after his father George Mackay. Thomas Henry Fitzgerald surveyed the township and proposed it was called Alexandra after Princess Alexandra of Denmark, who married Prince Edward (later King Edward VII). However, in 1862 the river was renamed to be the Pioneer River, after  in which Queensland Governor George Bowen travelled to the area, and the township name was changed to be Mackay in honour of John Mackay. Fitzgerald then decided to use the name Alexandra for his sugar cane plantation and sugar mill, which eventually provided the name to the Mackay suburb of Alexandra today.

There has always been much contention over the pronunciation of the name Mackay.

History

The area which is now Mackay City was originally inhabited by the local Yuibera people.

Yuwibara  (also known as Yuibera, Yuri, Juipera, Yuwiburra) is an Australian Indigenous language spoken on Yuwibara country. It is closely related to the Biri languages/dialects. The Yuwibara language region includes the landscape within the local government boundaries of the Mackay Region.

Captain James Cook, sailed past the Mackay coast on 1 June 1770 and named several local landmarks, including Cape Palmerston, Slade Point and Cape Hillsborough. It was during this trip that the Endeavour's botanist, Sir Joseph Banks, briefly recorded seeing Indigenous Australians.

In 1860, John Mackay led an overland expedition  to the region to obtain land. Finding most of the inland areas already having been selected by other British colonists, Mackay turned toward the coast and entered what he called the May Plains but is now known as the Pioneer Valley. Mackay was the first European to visit the region that is now named after him. He selected three large areas of land which he named Greenmount, Cape Palmerston and Shamrock Vale. In 1862 he returned with James Starr and 1200 head of livestock to establish these cattle stations but soon got into financial difficulty and sold them off.

In 1863, Mackay was declared a port of entry for settlers. Amongst the first boatload of arrivals was hotelier and future mayor Korah Halcomb Wills. Mackay was initially named Alexandra but the government soon changed it to Mackay to honour its founder. The first sale of town allotments was in 1864.

During the 1860s, the local Aboriginal population, as Henry Ling Roth puts it, "did what they could to defend their country and their lives." The local detachment of the Native Police under Robert Arthur Johnstone started patrolling the area in 1867, and encountered several Aboriginal camps on the north side of the Pioneer River, one of which contained more than 200 people. A newspaper report of the time says that Johnstone dealt with these people "in the usual and only effectual mode for restraining their savage propensities." The usual mode of the Native Police was terror, violence and massacre. In 1868 a large group of Aboriginal people killed 7 cattle at Greenmount. Johnstone and his troopers were sent out after them but it is unclear if he succeeded in "administering a lesson to the blackskins." Colonist, George Bridgman, provided some sanctuary to the remnants of the tribes and in 1871 an Aboriginal Reserve was gazetted near Rosella. This reserve shut in 1885.

In 1865, John Spiller, an Englishman who was connected with sugar plantations in colonial Java, planted the first sugarcane crop in the Mackay region. John Ewen Davidson and T. H. Fitzgerald built the first production sugar mill in 1868. Most of the labour on the sugar plantations was provided by South Sea Islanders. The first 70 of these workers arrived in Mackay on 12 May 1867 aboard the Prima Donna. and were sent to work at Fitzgerald's Alexandra Plantation.

By the mid-1880s there were over 30 sugar plantations and 26 sugar mills in the Mackay region. Over one third of the 6000 inhabitants were South Sea Islander labourers. On Boxing Day 1883, a race riot occurred between members of these workers and some of the European population at the Mackay racecourse. Hundreds of people on both sides threw bottles at each other until around 50 Anglo-Australian horsemen wielding stirrup irons galloped into the group of Islanders, knocking them down with their improvised weapons and riding over them. Officially two Islanders were killed but it was believed a greater number later died of injuries. One white man involved, George Goyner, was found guilty of assault and sentenced to two months in prison. Around thirty Islanders were also imprisoned.

In 1918, Mackay was hit by a major tropical cyclone causing severe damage and loss of life with hurricane-force winds and a large storm surge. The resulting death toll was further increased by an outbreak of bubonic plague. Communication links into Mackay were destroyed. The outside world did not learn of the Mackay cyclone until five days after impact, leading to some speculation the city had been completely destroyed. The disaster remains one of the most destructive cyclones to strike a populated centre in Australia.

The foundation stone of the Mackay War Memorial was laid on the river bank on 18 November 1928 by the mayor George Albert Milton. It was unveiled on 1 May 1929 by the mayor. Due to flooding, the memorial was relocated to Jubilee Park in 1945. Due to the construction of the Civic Centre, it was relocated to another part of the park in March 1973.

The largest loss of life in an Australian aircraft accident was a B17 aircraft, with 40 of 41 people on board perishing, on 14 June 1943, after departing from Mackay Aerodrome, and crashing in the Bakers Creek area.

 
The Rats of Tobruk Memorial commemorates those who died at and since the Battle of Tobruk. The memorial was dedicated on 4 March 2001.

On 18 February 1958, Mackay was hit with massive flooding caused by heavy rainfall upstream with 878 mm of rain falling at Finch Hatton in 24 hours. The water flowed down the valley and flooded Mackay within hours. Residents were rescued off rooftops by boats and taken to emergency accommodation. The flood broke Australian records.

In 1970 Queen Elizabeth II, the Duke of Edinburgh, and Princess Anne toured Australia including Queensland. The Queensland tour began on Sunday 12 April when the royal yacht Britannia entered Moreton Bay at Caloundra, sailing into Newstead Wharf. After visiting Brisbane, Longreach and Mount Isa the Royal Family travelled to Mackay. The visit to Mackay in the evening followed a late afternoon flight from Mount Isa on the 16 April. The Royal Family were taken to the Anglican Parish Hall at the intersection of Sydney and Gordon Streets for a civic reception, held in honour of their arrival.

On 15 February 2008, almost exactly 50 years from the last major flood, Mackay was devastated by severe flooding caused by over 600 mm of rain in 6 hours with around 2000 homes affected.

Mackay was battered by Tropical Cyclone Ului, a category three cyclone which crossed the coast at nearby Airlie Beach, around 1:30 am on Sunday 21 March 2010. Over 60,000 homes lost power and some phone services also failed during the storm, but no deaths were reported.

The Dudley Denny City Library opened in 2016.

In , the city of Mackay had a population of 78,685.

Heritage listings
Mackay has a number of heritage-listed sites, including:
 Alfred Street: Mackay Technical College
 Alfred Street: World War I Cenotaph
 251 Alfred Street: Mackay Central State School
 Cemetery Road: Mackay General Cemetery
 Cowleys Road: Selwyn House, Mackay
 38 East Gordon Street: East Gordon Street Sewerage Works
 39 Gordon Street: Holy Trinity Church
 Habana Road: Richmond Mill Ruins
 21 MacAlister Street: St Pauls Uniting Church
 10 River Street: WH Paxton & Co buildings
 31 River Street: Mackay Customs House
 239 Nebo Road: Sugar Research Institute
 63 Sydney Street: Mackay Town Hall
 Victoria Street: Mackay Court House and Police Station
 63 Victoria Street: Commonwealth Bank Building
 79 Victoria Street: Queensland National Bank
 1 Wood Street: Pioneer Shire Council Building
 57 Wood Street: Mackay Masonic Temple

Geography

Mackay is situated on the 21st parallel south adjacent to the Coral sea coast and about both banks of the Pioneer River. The Clarke Range lies to the west of the city. The city is expanding to accommodate for growth with most of the expansion happening in the Beachside, Southern, Central and Pioneer Valley suburbs. Suburbs to the north of the city such as Midge Point are also fast growing with residential estates in demand. 

There is disagreement about how to describe the location of Mackay, with debate ongoing as to whether the city is located in North Queensland or Central Queensland. 
There is no uniform agreement among either state or federal government agencies on the definition of North Queensland, with government services for Mackay being provided through both Townsville (North Queensland) and Rockhampton (Central Queensland).
In its news coverage, the national Australian Broadcasting Corporation consistently describes Mackay as being in North Queensland. The ABC's local radio station in Mackay is also called ABC Tropical North.
However, Queensland Health designates Mackay as a health district distinct from both Central Queensland and Townsville health districts and the Mackay-based rescue helicopter, part of the Queensland Health Aeromedical Retrieval Service, is called CQ Rescue.

Climate

Mackay has a humid subtropical climate (Cwa) under the Köppen climate classification.

Days are pleasant and warm; however, occasional cloudy days may keep the temperature below  all day. Frost is extremely rare in Mackay; however, it has been recorded to the west of the city during some winters. Mackay gets around 110.0 clear days annually.

Spring is usually dry, but significantly hotter and more humid than winter, with temperatures beginning to top  on a regular basis by November. Occasional thunderstorms may cause heavy downpours, but the very heavy rain will not arrive until later in summer.

December is the start of the wet season, which lasts until March or April. High humidity, almost daily rainfall and very warm nights are typical of this time of year. Monsoonal low pressure systems and tropical cyclones occasionally affect Mackay, and cause very heavy, prolonged periods of rain, with totals of up to  often being recorded in 24 hours during these systems.

Economy
As of the 2007–08, Mackay contributed $15.4 billion to the Australian economy, or 7.1% of Queensland's gross state product (GSP). This is largely on the back of its export-oriented industries of sugar and mining.

Mackay is famous for its history as one of Australia's largest sugarcane farming regions. However, in recent years, the mining industry has become the mainstay of the local economy.

Mining
 Mackay is widely recognised as the gateway to the Bowen Basin coal mining reserves of Central Queensland. It is the single largest coal reserve in Australia, with 34 operational coal mines extracting more than 100 million tonnes annually. While much of this is used in Australia, Japan and China are the largest export recipients.

Sugar
Mackay was known as the "sugar capital" of Australia, producing a sizeable portion of Australia's domestic supplies and exports. However, the industry experienced a decline in the 2000s.

The industry in Mackay has its roots back in the 19th century. Historically, plantations were small and had their own mills to crush the cane during harvest. Over the years as the industry grew and developed, co-operatives were formed to consolidate the harvesting, crushing and distribution of the sugar in selected zones. Throughout the 20th century, the privately owned mills in the Mackay district closed one by one until only three remained – Marian, Racecourse Mill,
and Farleigh. Today, Pleystowe is the oldest surviving mill in the district (but closed in 2008).

The Marian Sugar Cane Mill is situated in Marian, 25 km west of Mackay. At the Farleigh Mill, there are mill tours accessed via the internet. Racecourse Mill also does tours, and therefore accessible via the internet. Mackay Sugar operates three of these remaining mills, including Racecourse, which became site of the region's first sugar refinery (which is owned by CSR Limited) in the 1990s. Growers in the region have a total cane production area of approximately 86,000 hectares. The growers are capable (in good seasons) of supplying up to 6.5 million tonnes of cane to the factories for processing. On average, Mackay Sugar produces about 850,000 tonnes of raw sugar and 180,000 tonnes of the by-product molasses annually.

The sugar industry in Mackay has faced steep challenges since 2000, since it is largely dependent on high world sugar prices to remain viable. However, efforts are going into diversifying the use of sugar cane for different purposes. These include a planned energy co-generation plant that could deliver up to 30 per cent of Mackay's annual electricity supply.

Tourism
Compared to many of its neighbouring cities and regions in Queensland, Mackay's tourism industry is small and still developing. This is despite being close to notable attractions including Eungella National Park, the Great Barrier Reef, and the Whitsunday Islands.

Latest figures indicate about 685,000 domestic and international visitors come to the region annually. More telling, however, is that domestic and international visitor night stays have increased to 2.7 million annually, an increase of nearly 1 million since 2000.

Several new hotels have opened in the region since 2000, further indication of a growing industry. These include The Clarion International, Quest Serviced Apartments and the Ibis Mackay Airport.

Marine

Like tourism, the marine industry in Mackay is small but has a lot of potential. Mackay is well situated to become a major service centre for the marine industry, being in immediate proximity to the Whitsundays, and located halfway between Brisbane and Cairns.

Currently the Mackay Marina is the largest base in the district for the maintenance, refit and related services for all marine craft, particularly Super Yachts. The Mackay Whitsunday Super Yacht Cluster, a group of regional companies focusing on providing integrated repair, refit and provisioning for the increasing number of visiting super yachts, was established in 2001 to support and promote the development of this sector.

Retail

 Mackay has three main shopping centres. Caneland Central is the largest of these, with more than 130 speciality stores. Myer is among the new anchor tenants. This expansion was opened on 13 October 2011.

Mount Pleasant Shopping Centre is the second major shopping centre in the Mackay region. It hosts department stores, supermarkets and other speciality outlets. Outside the main centre, a number of bulky-good outlets also operate, along with a six-screen Birch Carroll and Coyle cinema complex.

The Mackay City Heart, located in the older city centre, is also another thriving part of the city. It is the home of many of the region's banks, law, accounting and other professional service firms.

Local attractions

Bluewater Trail

The primary purpose of the Bluewater trail is to facilitate pedestrian and cyclist-friendly activities that can be enjoyed anytime during the day or night. Now completed the track links several new attractions and tourism infrastructure pieces around the city including the Bluewater Lagoon, the Bluewater Quay and the Mackay Regional Botanic Gardens. It also incorporates the Sandfly Creek walkway through East Mackay, and the Catherine Freeman Walk which connects West Mackay to the city under the Ron Camm Bridge.

Located in the south of Mackay, the Mackay Regional Botanic Gardens are the start of the Bluewater Trail. The gardens opened and replaced Queen's Park as Mackay's botanic gardens in 2003 containing an array of rare plants native to the Mackay area and Central Queensland. Before 2003, the area was commonly called The Lagoons, and is centred on the shores of a billabong that years ago formed part of the Pioneer River further to the north. 

Heading east past the Mackay Base Hospital and along the Catherine Freeman Walk, the Bluewater Lagoon emerges. Comprising three tiered lagoons, the lagoon is a free family-friendly leisure facility overlooking the Pioneer River in the heart of Mackay's city centre. Similar to the well-known Streets Beach at the South Bank Parklands in Brisbane, the lagoon is a popular summertime attraction for locals and visitors.

Further east along the trail is Bluewater Quay. As part of Queensland's 150th anniversary celebrations, $12 million has been invested into the transformation of River Street, to the immediate east of the Forgan Bridge. The street now has various public amenities including access to a new viewing platform, upgraded fishing jetty, stage areas, cafes and space for weekend markets.

The Bluewater Trail project has been very successful, gained significant recognition and received several awards:

 In 2010, it received national recognition, collecting two awards at the National Heart Foundation Local Government Awards. The Bluewater Trail was named the National overall winner and won its category (Planning for Active Living) at the Heart Foundation Local Government Awards.
In 2010 and 2011, the trail was recognised in the Community Champions Award by the Queensland Spinal Injuries Association (QSIA). It was awarded for providing equitable and accessible facilities in the category of Best Recreation/Leisure Venue or Precinct.
 The Bluewater Trail has also gained considerable interest from other organisations and programs and has been used as an ‘inspirational example’ as part of the following two case studies in 2011:

 ‘Active Healthy Communities’ - a resource package for local government to create supportive environments for physical activity and healthy eating coordinated by Queensland Government (Queensland Health) in partnership with the Heart Foundation and Local Government Association of Queensland Ltd (LGAQ).
 ‘Healthy Community / Healthy Workplace projects or initiatives’ – case studies aiming to build the capacity of Queensland councils by raising awareness of the relevance, role and opportunities for creating healthy communities coordinated by Local Government Association of Queensland Ltd (LGAQ).

 In 2012 Mackay Regional Council Manager Recreation Services Mr Onno Van Es won the 2012 Local Government Association Queensland (LGAQ) Healthy Leaders Award (Senior Manager Category). "Onno was the visionary and leader behind two award winning council projects, the Bluewater Lagoon and the Bluewater Trail, that offer residents the chance to get outdoors and live a healthy lifestyle." He was recognised for "nurturing healthy partnerships across government jurisdictions and securing significant resources for healthy community infrastructure, shaping the environment through the creation of the award winning $30 million Bluewater Trail and $12.7 million Bluewater Lagoon projects and their activation through the delivery of healthy lifestyle programs."

Festival of Arts
The Mackay region is home to the Mackay Festival of Arts held annually throughout July. Now more than 20 years old, it is the largest regional arts festival in Queensland. The festival features wine and cheese tasting sessions, live jazz and other music, stand-up routines, art exhibitions, dance and other performances.

Artspace Mackay

Artspace Mackay, which opened in a new award-winning building designed by Cox Rayner Architects in February 2003, contains the Mackay Regional Council (MRC) Art Collection. This includes more than 1,200 artworks, and "one of the biggest holdings of artists' books in Australia outside of the capital cities".

City Centre

The City Centre is noted for its art-deco inspired architecture, with many buildings throughout the main streets of the central business district featuring distinctive designs from the early 20th century. Some of the most famous buildings are the former Main Post Office dating from 1940 with its clock tower, the Masonic Temple built in 1936, the Pioneer Shia Council built in 1935, Taylors Hotel (1936) and the Ambassador Hotel (1937). The Commonwealth Bank which was built as early as 1880 and the Old Court house dating from 1885 are two of the oldest buildings in town. The Technical College which was built 1911-12 is a part of the University. One of the most famous houses built in an art-deco style is Chaseley House in Sydney Street. The Town Hall dating from 1916 is one of the buildings which survived the cyclone of 1918 undamaged. St. Paul's Uniting Church which was completed in 1898 is the oldest church in town. One of the largest churches is St. Patrick Church whose parsonage built in 1915 is one of the oldest residential buildings in Mackay.
The precinct was upgraded in the 1990s through a unique community arts project. The overall theme depicts the environmental beauty of the Mackay region and consists of bronzed plaques, sculptures and terrazzo/mosaic tiles. Of particular interest is a sculptured free-form seat in the shape of a bommie, or bombora, and covered in myriad colours depicting the Great Barrier Reef through to the rainforests of Eungella National Park. Many boutique stores, restaurants, bars and nightclubs are established throughout the precinct.

Mackay Marina Village
Mackay Marina Village is a coastal precinct located adjacent to the Mackay Harbour. The marina itself has nearly 500 berths. It is also home to a sizeable residential village of luxury apartments, in addition to the Clarion Mackay Marina luxury hotel.

Gateway to the Pioneer Valley

The scenic Pioneer Valley spreads out to the west of Mackay, with the Pioneer River meandering through it  to the mouth at the port of Mackay. Nearly all of the sugar cane grown in the Mackay region comes from the Pioneer Valley, and it is synonymous with the rich soils and irrigation  with which the sugar industry in Mackay has thrived over the past century.

Among the natural assets of the Pioneer Valley are the walking tracks and swimming holes of Finch Hatton Gorge. The Eungella National Park, located at the very top of the range, is the longest and oldest stretch of subtropical rainforest in Australia, covering more than 51,700 hectares. It is one of the few places where platypus can be seen swimming in the wild, while more than 225 species of bird have been recorded in the surrounding forests.

Islands and beaches
Mackay has 31 beaches within driving distance. Closest to the city are Illawong, Far and Town beaches. The patrolled Harbour Beach, adjacent to the Mackay Marina, is the most popular, being suitable for swimming. Lambert's Beach is also close to the city. Further north of the city are popular beaches at Bucasia, Dolphin Heads, Blacks Beach, Shoal Point and Eimeo – collectively these areas are known as the Northern Beaches. The Northern Beaches are popular with visitors, but are increasingly being developed as residential areas for Mackay's growing population.

The islands immediately off Mackay are renowned for their azure blue waters, and are popular with fishermen. St Bees Island in particular is a well-known fishing spot. Brampton Island, to the north-east of the city, is a resort destination, with body therapy, water sports and snorkelling on offer. Flights to Brampton are available from Mackay Airport, as are boats from the marina. Carlisle, Scawfell and Keswick are other notable islands. Each is a national park surrounded by coral reefs. During the peak season from June to the end of August, whales can be heard and seen around these islands.

River Sessions Festival
Held annually in June, River Sessions is Mackay and Central Queensland's premier youth and contemporary music festival. The festival features the best rock, hip-hop, alternative, folk, pop and dance music acts from around Australia.

Transport
Two major highways, the A1 (Bruce Highway), and State Route 70 (Peak Downs Highway), pass through Mackay. The A1 connects the city to Townsville, Proserpine and Cairns in the north, and Rockhampton and Brisbane in the south. The Peak Downs Highway connects it to Moranbah, Clermont and Emerald in the south-west. In September 2020 the city was fully bypassed with users of the Bruce Highway able to use the new Mackay Ring Road to avoid the city.

The North Coast railway line meets the western line in the city's south. Trains from Brisbane pass through Mackay railway station and continue through to Proserpine, Townsville and Cairns, including the regular Spirit of Queensland service between Brisbane and Cairns. Minerals from the western line (Moranbah and other coal mining centres) are transported to Hay Point and Dalrymple Bay Coal Terminals for trans-shipment to other destinations. Mackay Harbour deals mainly with sugar exports and visiting cruise ships.

The city is served by Mackay Airport, from which QantasLink, Virgin Australia, and Jetstar offer flights to Brisbane, Sydney and Melbourne, as well as to regional destinations such as Geelong, Cairns, Townsville, Rockhampton and Gladstone. MacAir Airlines previously provided a limited service into and out of Mackay for mining companies before it went into receivership in 2009.

Mackay Transit Coaches operates from North Mackay to South Mackay. The area with the best service coverage is Mackay's central business district.

Health and education
The Mater Hospital, and the Mackay Specialist Day Hospital are in the city's north. The Pioneer Valley Hospital, which had initially ceased operating, has been converted into an injury rehabilitation center.

The Queensland Department of Education has 11 primary schools and 5 high schools in Mackay. The high schools are Pioneer State High School, Mackay State High School, Mackay North State High School, Mackay Northern Beaches State High School and Mirani State High School. One of the primary schools, Eungella State School was opened on 31 January 1928. Another, Mackay North State School, opened on 23 March 1915. The school celebrated its 100th anniversary in 2015.

The private system encompasses six and a half primary schools, Whitsunday Anglican School, two P-12 colleges, one P-10 college, one 7–10 college and St Patrick's College, which is the state's only 11–12 college.

The Mackay campus of Central Queensland University is in the outer suburb of Ooralea, while the local campus of James Cook University is in South Mackay. The city is also home to a TAFE (a technical/vocational college), which is in the south of the inner city.

The Mackay Regional Council operates the Dudley Denny City Library at 134 Victoria Street, and the Gordon White Library in the outer suburb of Mount Pleasant.

Government

Mackay is governed locally by the Mackay Regional Council, a product of the amalgamation of the former City of Mackay, formed in 1869, with surrounding shires. The mayor is Greg Williamson. Julieanne Gilbert is the member for the state seat of Mackay and Andrew Willcox is the federal member for the Division of Dawson, which includes Mackay and the surrounding areas.
The rates charged by the Mackay Regional Council for residential properties are amongst the highest in Queensland.

Sport
Rugby league is the most popular sport in Mackay, Mackay Cutters rugby league team played their first season in 2008 in the Queensland Cup and act as a feeder team to the North Queensland Cowboys (NRL). The 2nd placed Canterbury-Bankstown Bulldogs hosted a 'home' game at Mackay against the ladder leading Melbourne Storm in Round 16 of the 2012 NRL season for a record Mackay sporting ground attendance. In soccer, Magpies Crusaders United represents the Mackay region in the National Premier Leagues Queensland (NPLQ). In Basketball, Mackay Meteorettes (women) and Mackay Meteors (men) represent the region in the NBL1 North. Mackay also has a local Australian rules football league AFL Mackay and premiership AFLW matches are played at the Great Barrier Reef Arena. 

Mackay also has a local roller derby league: Mackay City Roller Maidens. The Mackay Cricket Association organises competition among its 6 member clubs: Magpies, Pioneer Valley, Brothers Mackay, Northern Suburbs, Southern Suburbs, and Walkerston. In the 1920s the Olympic Theatre in Mackay was a popular venue for professional boxing and saw stars like Colin Bell and Tom Heeney fight there. Such teams in junior and senior are: Mackay City Hawks, Northern Beaches Magpies, Moranbah Bulldogs, Eastern Swans, Sarina Demons and Mackay Saints.

Media
Mackay is served by several local radio stations including 4MK, Star 101.9, H!T FM, Triple M, ABC Tropical North, 4CRM and My105.9FM.  The ABC's national radio services are also available in Mackay.

The city receives broadcasts from five television networks – Seven Queensland, WIN Television (an affiliate of Nine Network), Channel 10, ABC TV and SBS. All networks also provide their additional digital multi-channel television stations to Mackay.

Of the three commercial networks, Seven Queensland airs a half-hour local news bulletin for Mackay and the Whitsundays each weeknight at 6pm, produced from a newsroom in the city and broadcast from studios in Maroochydore.

WIN previously produced a local WIN News bulletin for the area between April 2009 and May 2015. Southern Cross Nine aired a regional Queensland edition of Nine News from Brisbane, with local opt-outs for Mackay, from July 2017 to February 2019.

The only daily local newspaper in the city is the Daily Mercury.

Community groups 
The Mackay branch of the Queensland Country Women's Association meets at the CWA Hall at 43 Gordon Street.

Indigenous language 
Yumplatok  (also known as Torres Strait Creole and Broken) is a contemporary Torres Strait Island language originating in the Torres Strait. The contact with missionaries and others since the 1800s has led to the development of a pidgin language, which transitioned into a creole language and now has its own distinctive sound system, grammar, vocabulary, usage and meaning. Torres Strait Creole is spoken by most Torres Strait Islanders and is a mixture of Standard Australian English and traditional languages. It is an English-based creole; however, each island has its own version of creole. Torres Strait Creole is also spoken on the Australian mainland, including Northern Peninsula Area Region and coastal communities such as Cairns, Townsville, Mackay, Rockhampton and Brisbane.

People from Mackay

Ashley Alberts, Rugby League player 
Drew Anthony, performing arts director/choreographer
David Armitage, Australian rules footballer
Teneal Attard, Olympic field hockey player
Ben Barba, Rugby League player
Lauren Bella, Australian rules footballer
Anthony Bennett, artist
Todd Blanchfield, NBL player
Sandy Brondello, Olympic basketballer

Alayna Burns, racing cyclist
Ram Chandra, snake showman and supported the development of antivenene
Daly Cherry-Evans, Rugby League player
Mark Christensen, Rugby League player
Graeme Connors, country music singer/songwriter
Brett Dallas, Rugby league player 
Delvene Delaney, model, TV presenter and actress
Desmond Robert Dunn, author
Kirstin Dwyer, Hockey player
Cathy Freeman, Olympic sprinter
Nick Frost, Olympic swimmer
Declan Fraser, racing driver
Shane Knuth, politician
Dane Gagai, Rugby League player
Jodi Gordon, TV actress and model
Mick Gordon, video game composer and sound designer
Tom Gorman, Rugby League player (1901–1978) 
Tia Gostelow, a musician
Lloyd Graham, former Queensland Rugby Union player
Josh Hoffman, Rugby League player
Geoff Huegill, Olympic swimmer
Karen Jacobsen, Entertainer; The original female Australian voice of the Siri application on Apple iPhones, iPods and iPads.
Benita Johnson, Olympic distance runner
Aiden Krause, Australian Basketball championships winner of 2015 
Susan Lamb, former Federal Member for Longman in the Australian House of Representatives
Linda Mackenzie, Olympic swimmer
Melinda McLeod, world BMX champion
Bob McTavish, surfboard designer
George T. D. Moore, jockey and horse trainer
Dane Nielson, Rugby League player

Keith Payne, Victoria Cross recipient
Kalyn Ponga, Rugby League Player
Nicole Pratt, tennis player
Grant Rovelli, Rugby League player
Wendell Sailor, Rugby League Player
Brett Seymour, Rugby League player
William Forgan Smith, 24th Premier of Queensland
Clint Steindl, NBL and Australian basketball player
Grant Sullivan, cricketer
Isaiah Tass, Rugby League player
Jillian Whiting, former National Nine News presenter
Korah Halcomb Wills, former mayor of Mackay, kidnapper, butcher

In popular culture
Mackay is mentioned in "Gladstone Pier", the song by Redgum from the 1984 album Frontline.

Sister cities
Mackay has the following sister cities:

  Kailua Kona, Hawaii, United States since 4 January 1966
  Matsuura, Japan since 22 July 1989
  Honiara, Solomon Islands since 5 July 1995
  Yantai, China since 15 November 2012

References

External links

 University of Queensland: Queensland Places: Mackay
 Mackay Region website
 Mackay Regional Council
 Mackay Port Authority
 Mackay Post Office Discover Queensland Buildings website

 
Coastal cities in Australia
Port cities in Queensland